Hydroaviasalon or in full International Exhibition and Scientific Conference on Hydroaviation (translit. Gidroaviasalon) is an international airshow on hydroaviation held in Russia. It's held every even year since 1996 on a seashore at Gelendzhik. The event alternates with MAKS Airshow on general aviation, which is held in odd years.

The airshow draws special attention to amphibious aircraft and seaplanes, ship-based aircraft, fire-fighting aviation, missiles and sea-based space systems, search-and-rescue aviation, sea ecological monitoring aviation, navigation equipment, small ships, launches and yachts, Wing-In-Ground effect (WIG) crafts. 

Aircraft such as Beriev Be-200, A-40, Be-12P-200 and Be-103 are frequently shown at Hydroaviasalon.

Events 
 Gelendzhik '96
 Gelendzhik '98
 Gidroaviasalon '2000
 Gidroaviasalon '2002
 Gidroaviasalon '2004
 Gidroaviasalon '2006
 Gidroaviasalon '2008
 Gidroaviasalon '2010 (September 9-12 2010).
 Gidroaviasalon '2012 (September 6-9 2012)
 Gidroaviasalon '2014

External links 

 Official site of Hydroaviasalon
 HydroAviaSalon 2006 on Panoramio

Air shows